9Gem is an Australian free-to-air digital television multichannel, launched by the Nine Network in September 2010. The channel provides general entertainment and movie programming, from which the original name "GEM" is derived.

History
Nine Network CEO David Gyngell stated "GEM is part of Nine's strategy to create a cluster of complementary channels to cover all key audiences." The channel is aimed at everyone, including lifestyle programs and movies, with additional programming drawn from a combination of new shows and other shows previously aired on its sister channels Nine and GO!. The launch of GEM followed the success of GO!.

On 27 January 2014, 9Gem stopped using the Supertext logo and switched to Nine's closed captioning logo.

2015 rebrand
On 26 November 2015, the Nine Network introduced a network-wide rebrand of all of its digital channels with GEM being renamed "9Gem". Additionally, due to the rebroadcast of 9HD on channel 90, 9Gem was moved to channel 92 and converted from HD to SD. On 16 December 2015, 9Gem's on-air theme was changed for a continuous design across all of its channels. This included a new look for program listings, program advertisements and promos.

2016 regional media shakeup
Nine announced that it had signed a new affiliation deal with Southern Cross Austereo on 29 April 2016, replacing WIN Television as the primary Nine affiliate starting 1 July 2016. Consequently, 9Gem would be broadcast by Southern Cross into Regional Queensland, Southern NSW/ACT, Regional Victoria and Spencer Gulf SA/Broken Hill NSW on channel 52, also TDT in Tasmania on channel 52

Return of high definition
Channel 95, part of Nine's metropolitan DVB-T multiplex, was vacated after Your Money was closed down on 17 May 2019. An MPEG-4 HD feed of 9Gem was first broadcast in Darwin on 14 June 2019 on channel 95, then in Perth, Brisbane and Adelaide on 19 June 2019, followed by Sydney and Melbourne on 20 June 2019. On 1 August, NBN upgraded 9Gem to HD in Northern New South Wales and the Gold Coast. The HD simulcast was brought in ahead of their broadcast of the 2019 Ashes and the backend of the 2019 Cricket World Cup. This is the first time since 2015 that 9Gem was broadcast in HD. However, the SD broadcast continued on channel 92.

2021 regional media shakeup 
Nine Network announced that they have re-affiliated with WIN Television so 9Gem is now on channel 81.

Programming
The channel targets a broad range of viewers, broadcasting programs from Australia, New Zealand, the United Kingdom, Canada, and the United States, and complementing existing programming on Nine and 9Go!.

Programs aired on the channel are female-skewed, but also range from a mix of genres, including crime, lifestyle, drama, classic sitcoms, comedies, live sport and repeated high definition or silver screen films. The launch of the network is led by Showtime programs, The Big C and a new series of Weeds. Other imports include Birds of a Feather, Bless This House, Conan (moved to 9Go!), the CSI franchise, The Golden Girls, Law & Order, and more. Australian programs include Alive and Cooking, McLeod's Daughters, What's Good For You?, Amazing Medical Stories, Sea Patrol, Getaway and The Taste.

The network also has ongoing content new and classic film and television brands from Warner Bros. Pictures, Village Roadshow Pictures, StudioCanal, Lionsgate, Metro-Goldwyn-Mayer, Sony Pictures, DreamWorks Pictures, Paramount Pictures and Universal Pictures.

Original programming

Current programming

Comedy

 As Time Goes By
 Keeping Up Appearances
 Fawlty Towers
 My Favourite Martian

Drama

 Adventures in Rainbow Country
 Agatha Raisin
 The Avengers
 The Baron
 The Bill
 The Brokenwood Mysteries
 Chicago Med
 Chicago Fire
 Chicago P.D.
 The Closer
 Cold Case
 DCI Banks
 Death in Paradise (shared with ABC)
 Edgar Wallace Mysteries
 ER
 Gideon's Way
 Grantchester
 House
 Judging Amy
 Law & Order: Criminal Intent
 London Kills
 Major Crimes
 Marple
 Midsomer Murders
 Monarch of the Glen
 Murder, She Wrote
 New Tricks
 Poirot
 Rizzoli & Isles
 Seaway
 Silent Witness (shared with ABC)
 Skippy the Bush Kangaroo

Light Entertainment

 Antiques Roadshow (shared with ABC)
 Harry

Lifestyle

 The Garden Gurus (shared with 9Life)
 Getaway (shared with 9Life)

Sport
 The Sunday Footy Show (AFL) (New South Wales, Queensland, Northern Territory & Australian Capital Territory only)
 The Sunday Footy Show (NRL) (Victoria, South Australia, Western Australia & Tasmania only)
 Fina world aquatics championships

Soap Opera

 Days of Our Lives 
 The Young and the Restless

Religious
 This is Your Day! with Benny Hinn
 The Incredible Journey

Former programming

Comedy

 Absolutely Fabulous
 'Allo 'Allo!
 Are You Being Served?
 Birds of a Feather
 Blackadder
 Bless This House
 Friends (Now on 10 Peach)
 Gilligan’s Island
 The Golden Girls
 Green Acres
 Hot in Cleveland
 Step Dave (cancelled after one episode, later moved to Channel 9)
 The Golden Girls
 Mad About You
 The Nanny (Now on 7flix later on 9Go!)
 The Partridge Family
 The Young Ones

Documentary

 Animal Emergency
 Mary Queen of Shops
 My Strange Addiction
 Wild Europe

Drama

 The Big C
 CSI: Miami (Now on 10 Bold)
 CSI: NY (Now on 10 Bold)
 Gilmore Girls
 Heartbeat (moved to 7Two)
 McLeod's Daughters
 The Rockford Files
 Sea Patrol
 Secret Diary of a Call Girl
 Southland
 Weeds

Light Entertainment

 Conan (moved to 9Go!)
 The Ellen DeGeneres Show
 Random Acts of Kindness
 Secret Dealers

Lifestyle

 Alive and Cooking (Now on Channel 10 in Metro areas)
 Come Dine with Me - UK (shared with 9Life)
 Domestic Blitz
 The Great British Bake Off
 How Clean Is Your House?
 What's Good For You
 Wife Swap
 The Zoo

News and current affairs

 Nine News at 7
 Today (Simulcast with Channel 9)

Reality

 The People's Court
 Secret Millionaire
 The Taste

Factual

 Amazing Medical Stories
 Airport
 Customs
 Embarrassing Bodies
 Neighbours at War
 RBT
 RPA

Sport

 Footy Classified

News
News programming is generally not carried on 9Gem, but it has previously aired Nine News at 7 from August to October 2013. The bulletin was launched in response to the launch of Seven News at 7.00 on 7Two.

On previous occasions, 9Gem aired replays of Nine's Newsbreak that air on the main Nine channel and from 9Go!.

Sports
9Gem has also aired live sporting broadcasts in various markets including various Rugby Union World Cup matches in 2011, as well as portions of Nine's Cricket telecast (whilst the 6:00 pm news airs on the main Nine channel). Since 2012, 9Gem has televised live National Rugby League (NRL) matches into Victoria, Western Australia, South Australia and Tasmania, therefore putting it head-to-head with Seven/7mate's live Australian Football League (AFL) coverage in those states, and eliminating the need for Melbourne Storm fans, especially in Victoria, to have to wait until after midnight to watch their local team play (occasionally, Channel Nine Melbourne will televise Melbourne Storm matches in these timeslots on the main Nine channel, rather than 9Gem). Starting in Round 4 of the 2014 NRL season, for yet unexplained reasons 9Gem stopped showing the NRL on Friday nights and Sunday afternoons live into Adelaide, with the coverage for all games on Nine reverting to the after midnight 'graveyard shift'. As the change was unannounced and in Adelaide only (the rest of South Australia still receives the live coverage), this has angered many fans in the city, both South Australians and those who have re-located from NSW or Qld.

In 2011, Nine also showed both matches of the Bledisloe Cup live on 9Gem into Victoria, Western Australia, South Australia and Tasmania whilst in New South Wales and Queensland it was live on Nine. 9Gem simulcast Nine's coverage of the 2012 London Olympic Games live in High Definition, with the exception of Friday nights between 7.30–9.30pm where NRL was telecast nationally. On rare occasions, Nine's Newsbreaks were also occasionally simulcast in HD with the main channel, while 9Gem is off air.

9Gem broadcast the 2013 Ashes series for the first time on Australian television in HD. The broadcasts were hosted from Nine's Sydney studios by Tim Gilbert and former Australian captain Mark Taylor, with pictures and commentary provided by host broadcaster Sky Sports. During Gem's telecast of The Ashes, the NRL was shown on sister channel 9Go! in Melbourne, Adelaide, Perth and Tasmania on Friday nights when the cricket was scheduled. 9Gem showed all matches of the 2015 World Club Series. 9Gem also broadcast every match of the 2015 Ashes series from the United Kingdom.

In 2015 9Gem broadcast 17 matches of the 2015 Rugby World Cup including every Wallabies match and all the finals. 2013 until 2015 9Gem has broadcast cricket matches of the Matador BBQs One-Day Cup. In late 2015 9Gem also started to show 1 weekly NBL game on Sunday Afternoons, being hosted by Bill Baxter.

From February 2017, 9Gem will broadcast a Saturday Night double-header of Suncorp Super Netball. It will also televise every Australian Diamonds netball international fixture.

Availability
9Gem is available in standard definition in metropolitan areas through Nine Network owned-and-operated stations: TCN Sydney, GTV Melbourne, QTQ Brisbane, NWS Adelaide, STW Perth and NTD Darwin, as well as  NBN Northern New South Wales and other stations WIN Southern NSW/ACT, GTS/BKN Broken Hill NSW, AMN Griffith NSW, VTV Regional VIC, STV Mildura, RTQ Regional QLD, TVT Tasmania, GTS/BKN Spencer Gulf SA, SES/RTS Eastern SA, WOW Regional WA and Remote Central & Eastern.

Logo and identity history
When 9Gem was launched on 26 September 2010, it was given a "glassy" logo inspired by Nine's logo at the time with a purple colour, in contrast to Nine's trademark blue. Its slogan, Welcome to GEM, was also another nod to its parent channel and its slogan Welcome Home. Following the channel's rebrand as "9Gem" on 26 November 2015, the channel received a completely new logo, with its appearance inspired by sister channel 9Go!'s previous logo, featuring the famous "nine dots" from Nine's logo. WIN Television has a variant of the 9Gem logo with the aforementioned channel's logo above 9Gem's 2010–2015 logo.

Identity history
26 September 2010 – 26 November 2015: Welcome to GEM
26 September 2010 – 26 November 2015 (Alternative): Treat Yourself
2011: Your Time, Your Choice, Your GEM
26 November 2015 – present: Characters Belong

Notes

References

External links

Nine Network
Digital terrestrial television in Australia
Women's interest channels
English-language television stations in Australia
Television channels and stations established in 2010
2010 establishments in Australia